David Britton Funderburk (born April 28, 1944) is an American politician and diplomat who served as the Ambassador of the United States to Romania from 1981 to 1985. He later served as a Republican member of the U.S. House of Representatives from North Carolina for one term.

Early life and education 
Funderburk was born at Langley Field in Hampton, Virginia as the son of a pastor and school teacher. He grew up in Aberdeen, North Carolina and attended Wake Forest University from 1962 to 1967, earning a B.A. and M.A. He received his Ph.D. in 1974 from the University of South Carolina, with a thesis titled "British policy towards Romania, 1938–1940: A Study in Economic and Political Strategy".

Career 
Prior to entering politics, Funderburk worked as a professor of history. He initially taught at Wingate University and then later at the University of South Carolina, Hardin–Simmons University, and Campbell University. He was a Fulbright Scholar who later received Romania's highest award to a foreigner. The University of Bucharest and Campbell University gave him honorary doctorates.

In 1981, Funderburk was chosen as the U.S. Ambassador to the Socialist Republic of Romania, and served until 1985. In Pinstripes and Reds, a book published in 1987, he described the process by which he was nominated and confirmed to be ambassador, as well as aspects of life in Romania during the administration of Nicolae Ceaușescu. In 1986, Funderburk ran for the U.S. Senate, but was defeated in the Republican primary by incumbent Jim Broyhill.

Funderburk became a professional lecturer and writer in 1988 and was elected as a Republican to the 104th Congress in 1994, coming in as a part of the Republican Revolution. Funderburk was the first Republican to represent his district since 1901.

Funderburk was an unsuccessful candidate for reelection to the 105th Congress. His defeat was largely blamed on a car accident in which he was involved. Witnesses claimed that he was driving but then switched seats with his wife.

Books
 If the Blind Lead the Blind: The Scandal Regarding the Mis-teachings of Communism in American Universities Erwin, N.C.: Carolina Arts and Publishing House, 1978.
 British Policy Toward Romania, 1938–1940 N.p., 1983.
 Pinstripes and Reds: An American Ambassador Caught Between the State Department & the Romanian Communists, 1981–1985 Washington, D.C.: Selous Foundation Press, 1987.

References

External links

 

1944 births
Living people
Ambassadors of the United States to Romania
Wake Forest University alumni
University of South Carolina alumni
Politicians from Hampton, Virginia
Wingate University faculty
University of South Carolina faculty
Campbell University faculty
Hardin-Simmons University faculty
Republican Party members of the United States House of Representatives from North Carolina
Baptists from Virginia
People from Southern Pines, North Carolina
Baptists from North Carolina
20th-century American diplomats
Members of Congress who became lobbyists